Forgiven is the Los Lonely Boys' fifth album and their third studio set, released on July 1, 2008.

The album sticks to their fuller sound, which was showcased in their previous album, Sacred, and is primarily blues based.

Track listing
All songs written by Henry, Jojo and Ringo Garza, except track 5.

"Heart Won't Tell a Lie" – 3:51
"Forgiven" – 3:33
"Staying with Me" – 4:01
"Loving You Always" – 2:45
"I'm a Man" (Steve Winwood/Jimmy Miller)– 4:04
"Make It Better" – 3:26
"Love Don't Care about Me" – 3:30
"Cruel" – 3:44
"You Can't See the Light" – 3:33
"Superman" – 3:06
"Another Broken Heart" – 3:04
"The Way I Feel" – 2:54

Bonus Tracks 
"There's A War Tonight 
"Guero In The Barrio

Personnel
Los Lonely Boys
Henry Garza - vocals, electric and acoustic guitar
Jojo Garza - vocals, bass guitar, Wurlitzer electric piano
Ringo Garza - vocals, drums, percussion

Additional
Dr. John - Hammond B3 on tracks 9, 11, Wurlitzer electric piano on track 12
Steve Jordan - percussion on track 5

References

2008 albums
Los Lonely Boys albums
Epic Records albums